The Corumbaense Futebol Clube, usually known simply as Corumbaense, is a Brazilian football club based in Corumbá in the state of Mato Grosso do Sul. Established in 1914. The club competed in the Campeonato Brasileiro Série A in 1985.

As of 2022, Corumbaense is the second-best ranked team from Mato Grosso do Sul in CBF's national club ranking, being placed 137th overall.

Current squad

Achievements
 Campeonato Sul-Matogrossense: 1984, 2017
 Campeonato Sul-Matogrossense Série B: 2006

References

Association football clubs established in 1914
Football clubs in Mato Grosso do Sul
1914 establishments in Brazil